Bodenseesender was a radio transmission facility of VoA, US SWR (until 1998 SWF) near Meßkirch-Rohrdorf in Southern Germany for medium wave established in 1964. It shut down on January 8, 2012, and one month later, on February 7, 2012, the last mast was demolished.

Background
Bodenseesender had been used since July 1, 2002 for the propagation of SWR Cont.Ra on the medium wave frequency 666 kHz, u v.a.. Until 1978 the aerial of the medium wave transmitter consisted of 4 guyed steel framework masts, which are insulated against ground. In the mid 1970s two of these masts were dismantled. One of them was rebuilt on a new site not far away from it earlier site in order to form with one of the two masts, which were not dismantled a directional aerial, while the other was rebuilt at Nierstein in Rhineland-Palatina. On the site of the latter mast a  guyed steel framework mast was erected, which is also insulated against ground. At the construction of this mast, the length of the upper guys were chosen in such way, that there is no disturbation of its radiation pattern when grounded directly at the anchor blocks. So the upper guys do not have any intermediate insulators. They are only insulated toward the mast. However the guys of the lowest level are divided by one intermediate insulator electrically in two parts.

Until October 19, 2004 there was a shortwave transmitter on the site of the Bodenseesender, which was used to transmit the program of SWR 3 on 7265 kHz.
For the shortwave transmitter, there was a small cage aerial at 48°1′24″N and 9°7′11″E and a dipole aerial at 48°1′29″N and 9°7′5″E.

In spring 2005 the two  guyed masts which were situated at 48°1′19″N, 9°7′12″E and at 48°1′24″N, 9°7′18″E were demolished.

Geographical coordinates

240 metres 
 
  (dismantled)
  (dismantled)

244 metres

See also
 List of masts
 List of famous transmission sites

References

External links

 
 
 http://www.skyscraperpage.com/diagrams/?b45792
 http://www.skyscraperpage.com/diagrams/?b45793

Former radio masts and towers
Radio masts and towers in Germany
Relocated buildings and structures
Towers completed in 1964
1964 establishments in West Germany
2012 disestablishments in Germany
Buildings and structures demolished in 2012